Justine may refer to:

People with the name
 Saint Justine of Padua (died 304), Christian martyr
 Justine Augier (born 1978), French writer
 Justine Ayebazibwe (born 1972), Ugandan politician
 Justine Baltazar (born 1997), Filipino basketball player
 Justine Bateman (born 1966), American actress, director and writer
 Justine Bayigga (born 1979), Ugandan sprinter
 Justine Benin (born 1975), French employment counselor and politician
 Justine Bitagoye, Burundian journalist
 Justine Blainey-Broker (born 1973), Canadian ice hockey player
 Justine Bouchard (born 1986), Canadian freestyle wrestler
 Justine Braisaz-Bouchet (born 1996), French biathlete
 Justine Brasseur (born 2001), Canadian figure skater
 Justine Caines (1973–2022), Australian advocate and lobbyist
 Justine Caldwell, American politician
 Justine Carroll, Australian rower
 Justine Cassell (born 1960), American professor
 Justine A. Chambers, Canadian choreographer and dancer
 Justine Clarke (born 1971), Australian actress, singer and television presenter
 Justine Comeau (born 1998), Canadian curler
 Justine Cotsonas (born 1985), American actress
 Justine Cuadra (born 1998), Ecuadorian soccer player
 Justine Dorog (born 1998), Filipino volleyball player
 Justine Dufour-Lapointe (born 1994), Canadian freestyle skier
 Justine Dupont (born 1991), French surfer
 Justine Elliot (born 1967), Australian police officer and politician
 Justine Ettler (born 1965), Australian author
 Justine Evans (born 1966), English wildlife filmmaker
 Justine Ezarik (born 1984), American YouTube personality
 Justine Favart (1727–1772), French opera singer, actress, dancer and playwright
 Justine Fedronic (born 1991), French middle-distance runner
 Justine Frischmann (born 1969), English artist and musician
 Justine Fryer (born 1972), New Zealand cricketer
 Justine Greening (born 1969), English politician
 Justine Hardy (born 1966), English author and journalist
 Justine Hastings, American academic and economist
 Justine Henin (born 1982), Belgian tennis player
 Justine Hodder (born 1972), Australian tennis player
 Justine Johnston (1921–2006), American actress
 Justine Johnstone (1895–1982), American actress and pathologist
 Justine Joyce (born 1974), Australian rower
 Justine Keay (born 1975), Australian politician
 Justine Kerfoot (1906–2001), American writer
 Justine Khainza (born 1982), Ugandan politician and social worker
 Justine Kish (born 1988), Russian–American mixed martial artist
 Justine Kurland (born 1969), American photographer
 Justine Larbalestier (born 1967), Australian writer
 Justine Lavea (born 1984), New Zealand rugby player
 Justine Lerond (born 2000), French soccer player
 Justine Lévy (born 1974), French author and book editor
 Justine Lindsay (born 1992), American cheerleader and dancer
 Justine Lorton (born 1974), English soccer player
 Justine Lucas (born 1990), English rugby player
 Justine McCarthy, Irish writer
 Justine McEleney (born 1994), English beauty queen
 Justine McIntyre, Canadian politician
 Justine Moore (born c. 1992), English wheelchair fencer 
 Justine Mules (born 1994), Australian rules footballer
 Justine Musk (born 1972), Canadian author
 Justine Nahimana (born 1979), Burundian long-distance runner
 Justine O'Brien, Australian zoologist
 Justine Otto (born 1974), German painter
 Justine Ozga (born 1988), German tennis player
 Justine Palframan (born 1993), South African sprinter
 Justine Paris (1705–1774), French courtesan and madam 
 Justine Pasek (born 1979), Ukrainian–born Polish–Panamanian beauty queen, model and philanthropist
 Justine Pelletier (born 2001), Canadian rugby player
 Justine Pelmelay (born 1958), Dutch singer
 Justine Pimlott, Canadian documentarian
 Justine W. Polier (1903–1987), American judge
 Justine Priestley (born 1968), Canadian actress
 Justine Rasir (born 2001), Belgian field hockey player
 Justine Robbeson (born 1985), South African javelin thrower
 Justine Roberts (born 1967), English businesswoman
 Justine Rodrigues (born 1993), Canadian–born Guyanese soccer player
 Justine Russell (born 1974), New Zealand cricketer
 Justine Cathrine Rosenkrantz (1659–1746), Danish spy
 Justine Saunders (1953–2007), Australian actress
 Justine Schofield (born 1985), Australian chef and television presenter
 Justine Shapiro (born 1963), South African–born American actress, director, producer and writer
 Justine Shaw, Australian Antarctic researcher and conservationist
 Justine Siegal (born 1975), American baseball coach and sports educator
 Justine Siegemund (1636–1705), German midwife
 Justine Skye (born 1995), American model, singer and songwriter
 Justine Smethurst (born 1987), Australian softball player
 Justine Sowry (born 1970), Australian field hockey player
 Justine Stafford, Irish comedian, writer and television presenter
 Justine Suissa (born 1970), English singer and songwriter
 Justine Thornton (born 1970), English barrister and judge
 Justine Triet (born 1974), French director and writer
 Justine Tsiranana (c. 1918–1999), Malagasy public figure who served as the first First Lady of Madagascar 
 Justine Tunney (born 1984), American activist and software developer
 Justine Vanhaevermaet (born 1992), Belgian soccer player
 Justine Verdier (born 1985), French pianist
 Justine Waddell (born 1976), South African actress
 Justine Wadsack, American politician
 Justine Ward (1879–1975), American musical educator
 Justine Wong-Orantes (born 1995), American volleyball player
 Justine Wright, New Zealand film editor
 Justine Zulu (born 1989), Zambian soccer player

Culture
 Justine (Durrell novel), the first book in The Alexandria Quartet by Lawrence Durrell
 Justine (de Sade novel) or The Misfortunes of Virtue, a 1791 novel by Marquis de Sade
 Justine (Thompson novel), a 1996 novel by Alice Thompson
 Cruel Passion, a 1977 film starring Koo Stark and Glory Annen
 Justine (1969 film), a 1969 film by George Cukor and Joseph Strick, based on Durrell's novel
 Marquis de Sade: Justine, a 1969 film by Jesús Franco, based on de Sade's novel
 Justine (2020 film), a British romantic drama film
 "Justine", a song on Linda Ronstadt's 1980 album Mad Love
 Amnesia: Justine, a 2011 expansion story for the Amnesia: The Dark Descent video game

See also
 Justina (name)
 

English feminine given names
Feminine given names
English given names
French feminine given names